The Popular Nasserist Organization – PNO or Organisation Populaire Nassérienne (OPN) in French, is a Sidon-based Nasserist party originally formed in 1973 by Maarouf Saad, a Sunni Muslim pan-Arab politician and member of Parliament (MP) later killed by the Lebanese Army during a February 1975 dock strike held in that port city.

Structure and organization

The PNO's military wing, the National Liberation Army – NLA or Armée de Liberation Nationale (ALN) in French, was first raised in March 1975 at Sidon by Mustafa Saad, son of the late Maarouf.  Secretly trained and armed by Fatah, the NLA was initially financed by Yasser Arafat's organization and Libya, later replaced in the mid-1980s by the Sidon-born Saudi-Lebanese millionaire Rafic Hariri, in order to protect his business interests in the Sidon area. 
A small but disciplinated fighting force, predominately Sunni Muslim with some Shia Muslims and Christians, the NLA comprised some 500-1,000 uniformed male and female fighters organized into conventional 'Commando', Infantry, Signals, and Military Police branches. It fielded a 'mechanized' corps provided with a single UR-416 armoured car seized from the Lebanese Forces in 1985, plus 40 all-terrain vehicles converted into technicals. The latter consisted mostly of Suzuki Jimny LJ20 1st generation off-road mini SUVs, Land-Rover series II-III, Toyota Land Cruiser (J43), Toyota Land Cruiser (J70), Toyota Land Cruiser (J75), GMC Sierra Custom K25/K30, Datsun 620 and Datsun 720 pickup trucks, and Dodge Fargo/Power Wagon W200 light trucks armed with heavy machine-guns, recoilless rifles and anti-aircraft autocannons.

The PNO in the Civil War: 1975–90 

Closely allied with the Al-Mourabitoun, the PNO/NLA joined the Lebanese National Movement (LNM) in April 1975, playing a somewhat significant role in the controversial siege of the Christian coastal town of Damour alongside the Al-Mourabitoun, the PLO and Palestine Liberation Army units on 20–22 January 1976, and later took part in the 'Spring offensive' held in March that year on the Mount Lebanon region.  Forced to go underground during the June 1982 Israeli invasion of Lebanon when the Israeli Defence Forces (IDF) occupied Sidon, the PNO/NLA re-formed in the wake of the Israeli pull-out from southern Lebanon in March–April 1985, and fought alongside the Palestinians at the battles for Kfar-Fallus and Jezzine against the Israeli-backed South Lebanese Army (SLA). Simultaneously, during the Coastal War they joined in a Syrian-backed coalition with the Druze Progressive Socialist Party (PSP), the Sunni Al-Mourabitoun and the Shi'ite Amal Movement, which defeated the Christian Lebanese Forces (LF) attempts to establish bridgeheads at Damour and Sidon.

The post-war years
The PNO is led today by Osama Saad, who is an MP in the Lebanese Parliament, and is active in the city of Sidon. It was affiliated with the March 8 Alliance until the 2019 protests in Lebanon, which the party supports.

See also 
Al-Mourabitoun
Coastal War
Damour massacre
Nasserism
People's Liberation Army (Lebanon)
Lebanese National Movement
Lebanese Civil War
List of armed groups in the Syrian Civil War
 List of weapons of the Lebanese Civil War
3rd Infantry Brigade (Lebanon)

Notes

References

Afaf Sabeh McGowan, John Roberts, As'ad Abu Khalil, and Robert Scott Mason, Lebanon: a country study, area handbook series, Headquarters, Department of the Army (DA Pam 550-24), Washington D.C. 1989. - 
Boutros Labaki & Khalil Abou Rjeily, Bilan des guerres du Liban (1975-1990), Collection "Comprendre le Moyen-Orient", Éditions L'Harmattan, Paris 1993.  (in French)
Denise Ammoun, Histoire du Liban contemporain: Tome 2 1943-1990, Fayard, Paris 2005.  (in French) – 
Edgar O'Ballance, Civil War in Lebanon, 1975-92, Palgrave Macmillan, London 1998. 
Joseph Hokayem, L'armée libanaise pendant la guerre: un instrument du pouvoir du président de la République (1975-1985), Lulu.com, Beyrouth 2012. , 1291036601 (in French) – 
Fawwaz Traboulsi, Identités et solidarités croisées dans les conflits du Liban contemporain; Chapitre 12: L'économie politique des milices: le phénomène mafieux, Thèse de Doctorat d'Histoire – 1993, Université de Paris VIII, 2007. (in French) – 
Marius Deeb, The Lebanese Civil War, Praeger Publishers Inc., New York 1980. 
Moustafa El-Assad, Civil Wars Volume 1: The Gun Trucks, Blue Steel books, Sidon 2008. 
Mordechai Nisan, The Conscience of Lebanon: A Political Biography of Etienne Sakr (Abu-Arz), Frank Cass Publishers, London 2003. 
 Rex Brynen, Sanctuary and Survival: the PLO in Lebanon, Boulder: Westview Press, Oxford 1990.  – 
Robert Fisk, Pity the Nation: Lebanon at War, London: Oxford University Press, (3rd ed. 2001).  – 
Samer Kassis, 30 Years of Military Vehicles in Lebanon, Beirut: Elite Group, 2003. 
Samir Makdisi and Richard Sadaka, The Lebanese Civil War, 1975-1990, American University of Beirut, Institute of Financial Economics, Lecture and Working Paper Series (2003 No.3), pp. 1–53. – 
Steven J. Zaloga, Tank battles of the Mid-East Wars (2): The wars of 1973 to the present, Concord Publications, Hong Kong 2003.  –

Further reading

 Fawwaz Traboulsi, A History of Modern Lebanon: Second Edition, Pluto Press, London 2012. 
Jean Sarkis, Histoire de la guerre du Liban, Presses Universitaires de France - PUF, Paris 1993.  (in French)
Samir Kassir, La Guerre du Liban: De la dissension nationale au conflit régional, Éditions Karthala/CERMOC, Paris 1994.  (in French)
 William W. Harris, Faces of Lebanon: Sects, Wars, and Global Extensions, Princeton Series on the Middle East, Markus Wiener Publishers, Princeton 1997. , 1-55876-115-2

1973 establishments in Lebanon
Arab nationalism in Lebanon
Arab nationalist militant groups
Factions in the Lebanese Civil War
March 8 Alliance
Nasserist political parties
Nationalist parties in Lebanon
Political parties established in 1973
Socialist parties in Lebanon